Njoeng Jacob Kondre Airstrip  is an airstrip serving Njoeng Jacob Kondre, Suriname.

Charters and destinations 
Charter Airlines serving this airport are:

Accidents or incidents 
 On 10 February 2001, Gum Air’s GAF Nomad N24A, registered PZ-TBP was written off when it crashed on a flight from Paramaribo – Zanderij Johan Adolf Pengel International Airport PBM/SMJP to Njoeng Jacob Kondre Airstrip (IATA: SMJK). The Nomad plane had fallen out of radio contact, and personnel at the airstrip in Jacob Kondre said it was flying low and crashed into a mountain. All 9 passengers plus the pilot perished.

See also

 List of airports in Suriname
 Transport in Suriname

References

External links
OpenStreetMap - Njoeng Jacob Kondre

Airports in Suriname
Sipaliwini District